Issa Ali Abbas Mangungu (born October 13, 1981) is a Tanzanian politician and a member of the Chama Cha Mapinduzi political party. He was elected MP representing Mbagala in 2015.

References 

1981 births
Living people
Tanzanian MPs 2015–2020